John Lovett Watts  (born 1964) is an English historian specialising in the political history of late-medieval England. Born on 29 September 1964, he studied for his PhD under Christine Carpenter, researching politics and the English constitution during the reign of King Henry VI, which was awarded in early 1991. He had joined Merton College, Oxford, the previous year as a junior research fellow, and from there became a lecturer at the University of Aberystwyth. He returned to Oxford in 1997, joining Corpus Christi College as a fellow and tutor in medieval history. He has described the context of his interests – Henry VI – as "a famously useless king, who came to the throne as a baby and ruled with astonishing inertness for a further thirty-nine years". He is now professor and a fellow of the Royal Historical Society.

Bibliography
 Henry VI and the politics of Kingship (1996)
 History of Universities: Volume XXXII / 1-2: Renaissance College, Corpus Christie College, Oxford; 1450-1600, Volume 32 (2019) Mordechai Feingold and John Watts (Editors)

References

1964 births
20th-century English historians
21st-century English historians
Academics of Aberystwyth University
British medievalists
Fellows of Corpus Christi College, Oxford
Fellows of the Royal Historical Society
Historians of England
Intellectual historians
Living people
Political historians